The Talari Gorges or Gorges de Talary are a series of gorges on the Sénégal River in Mali, between the towns of Bafoulabé (upstream) and Galougo (downstream) in the Kayes Region, at an altitude of about 75 meters or 249 feet above sea level. They are celebrated for their grandiose beauty. Downstream, to the north of the gorges are the spectacular Gouina Falls.

The gorges are made from red sandstone, which is approximately 600 million years old.

References

Talari Gorges
Rivers of Mali